SedDB was created as an online data management and information system for sediment geochemistry.

SedDB is based on a relational database that contains the full range of analytical values for sediment samples, primarily from marine sediment cores, including major and trace element concentrations, radiogenic and stable isotope ratios, and data for all types of material such as organic and inorganic components, leachates, and size fractions. SedDB also archives a vast array of metadata relating to the individual sample. Examples of Seddb metadata are: sample latitude and longitude; elevation below sea surface; material analyzed; analytical methodology; analytical precision and reference standard measurements. As of April, 2013 SedDB contains nearly 750,000 individual analytical data points of 104,000 samples. SedDB contents have been migrated to The EarthChem Portal.

Purpose 

SedDB was developed to complement current geological data systems (PetDB, EarthChem, NavDat and Georoc) with an integrated and easily accessible compilation of geochemical data of marine and continental sediments to be utilized for sedimentological, geochemical, petrological, oceanographic, and paleoclimate research, as well as for educational purposes.

Funding and management 

SedDB was developed, operated and maintained by a joint team of disciplinary scientists, data scientists, data managers and information technology developers at the Lamont–Doherty Earth Observatory as part of the Integrated Earth Data Applications (IEDA) Research Group funded by the US National Science Foundation. SedDB was built collaboratively by researchers and information technologists at the Lamont–Doherty Earth Observatory, Oregon State University, Boston University, and Boise State University.

References

External links 
EarthChem Portal
Lamont Doherty Earth Observatory
Petrological Database of the Ocean Floor
Earthchem
EarthChem Library

Geochemistry